Journey to the West is one of the Four Great Classical Novels of Chinese literature attributed to Wu Cheng'en.  

Journey to the West may also refer to:

Television
 Monkey (TV series) or Journey to the West, a 70's Japanese television drama based on the Chinese novel Journey to the West, by Wu Cheng'en
 Journey to the West (1986 TV series), two-season Chinese television series produced by CCTV, released in the 1980s and 1998
 Journey to the West (1996 TV series), Hong Kong television series produced by TVB
 Journey to the West II, a 1998 sequel to the 1996 television series.
 Journey to the West: Legends of the Monkey King, a 1999 animated series
 Wu Cheng'en and Journey to the West, a 2010 Chinese television series
 Journey to the West (2010 TV series), Chinese television series commonly referred to as the "Zhejiang version" to avoid confusion with the 2011 television series
 Journey to the West (2011 TV series), Chinese television series produced by Zhang Jizhong

Film
Journey to the West: Conquering the Demons, a 2013 Chinese film by Stephen Chow
 Journey to the West (2014 film), a 2014 film
 Journey to the West: The Demons Strike Back, 2017 sequel also by Stephen Chow

Other uses
 Journey to the West, one of the Four Journeys, a separate telling of the events of Tripitaka's journey to India
 Monkey: Journey to the West, a stage adaptation
 Journey to the West (album), the soundtrack to the stage adaptation

See also
 A Supplement to the Journey to the West, 1640 Chinese novel that acts as an addendum to the original work
 New Journey to the West, 2015 South Korean travel reality show
 Saiyuki (disambiguation)
 List of media adaptations of Journey to the West
 Travels to the West of Qiu Chang Chun
 Journey to the East (disambiguation)